The 2018 Tour of Flanders for Women was the 15th running of the Tour of Flanders for Women, a women's bicycle race in Belgium. It was held on 1 April 2018, as the fifth race of the 2018 UCI Women's World Tour. Anna van der Breggen won the race with an attack just after the Kruisberg, at 27 km from the finish. Amy Pieters won the sprint for second place, at more than a minute from van der Breggen.
Annemiek van Vleuten rounded out the entirely Dutch podium.

Teams
Twenty-four teams participated in the race. Each team had a maximum of six riders:

Summary

On 1 April 2018, the 15th Tour of Flanders for Women was run. It started and finished in Oudenaarde, with an identical route to the men's race, covering . The race was won by Olympic champion Anna van der Breggen after a  solo attack on the top of the Kruisberg. A crash just before the Muur van Geraardsbergen split the peloton early in the race. A select group of riders made a further gap on the Kruisberg, after which van der Breggen made her decisive move. She increased her lead on the Oude Kwaremont and Paterberg and maintained her effort to claim her first Tour of Flanders victory. Amy Pieters and Annemiek van Vleuten completed the entirely Dutch podium.

Results

UCI World Tour

Attributed points

Individual ranking after Tour of Flanders

References

2018
Tour
2018 UCI Women's World Tour
April 2018 sports events in Europe